Sengerema District is one of seven districts in the Mwanza Region of Tanzania, East Africa.  Its administrative headquarter is located in Sengerema town. It is bordered to the north and east by Lake Victoria, to the south by Geita Region and to the southeast by the Misungwi District. Sengerema district is known for having numerous lake islands in its territory the largest are Maisome Island and Kome Island.

Demographics 

In 2016 the Tanzania National Bureau of Statistics report there were 377,649 people in the district, from 663,034 in 2012.

Administrative subdivisions 

Sengerema District is divided into 3 divisions, 26 wards, 71 villages and 421 hamlets (vitongoji).

Constituencies 
For parliamentary elections, Tanzania is divided into constituencies. As of the 2010 elections Sengerema District had two constituencies:  
 Buchosa Constituency
 Sengerema Constituency

Wards 
Ward (2016 Population)

 Bitoto (5,904)
 Busisi (8,281)
 Buyagu (11,537)
 Buzilasoga (15,035)
 Chifunfu (26,337)
 Ibisabageni (14,932)
 Ibondo (1,691)
 Igalula (21,234)
 Igulumuki (10,096)
 Kagunga (22,322)
 Kahumulo (10,686)
 Kasenyi (17,562)
 Kasungamile (17,571)
 Katunguru (22,848)
 Kishinda (13,902)
 Mission (9,909)
 Mwabaluhi (12,215)
 Ngoma (11,070)
 Nyamatongo (19,013)
 Nyamazugo (11,381)
 Nyamizeze (7,039)
 Nyampande (10,781)
 Nyampulukano (25,175)
 Nyatukala (22,715)
 Sima (17,434)
 Tabaruka (10,979)

References 

 
Districts of Mwanza Region